Fortune Green is a ward in the London Borough of Camden, in the United Kingdom. The ward has existed since the May 1978 local elections and was redrawn in May 2002. The ward will undergo minor boundary changes for the 2022 election. In 2018, the ward had an electorate of 9,190. The Boundary Commission projects the electorate to rise to 9,247 in 2025. The ward is centred on the Fortune Green area of west Camden.

Election results

Elections in the 2020s

References

Wards of the London Borough of Camden
1978 establishments in England